Wider than the Sky: The Phenomenal Gift of Consciousness is an English-language book on neuroscience by the neuroscientist Gerald M. Edelman. Yale University Press published the book in 2004 . The book includes a glossary, a bibliographic note, and an index. The title alludes to an English-language poem written by Emily Dickinson in about 1862 . In that poem, Dickinson describes the brain as "wider than the Sky", "deeper than the sea", and "just the weight of God".

In the preface (page xiii), Edelman describes, as follows, the purpose of the book.

The book's content is similar to the 2000 book Edelman co-authored: A Universe of Consciousness: How Matter Becomes Imagination. Both books put forward the theory of neuronal group selection, also known as Neural Darwinism. Both books make a distinction between primary consciousness and higher-order consciousness.

Reviews

2004 non-fiction books
Biology books
Books about consciousness